Live in New York is a live album by performance artist Laurie Anderson released as a double-CD by Nonesuch Records in 2002. The album cover reads Laurie Anderson Live at Town Hall New York City September 19–20, 2001.

Recorded soon after the September 11, 2001, attacks on New York City, the album was produced during Anderson's tour of the United States featuring a mix of pieces from earlier in her career and newer works. Following so close to the attacks, Anderson makes several statements about them in her recognizable style. The performance is highlighted by a rendition of "O Superman," the song that launched Anderson to stardom in 1981, with lyrics that offered new resonance following the attacks. The song "Progress" is a retitled performance of "The Dream Before" which Anderson debuted in her 1986 short film What You Mean We? and later featured on Strange Angels.

The original release of the album included an insert with a short piece written by Anderson about the experience of performing in New York in the wake of 9/11. She also indicates that the tour was conceived as a live version of her recent Life on a String album, but her partner Lou Reed suggested she include some older works as well.

Track listing
All tracks composed by Laurie Anderson; except where indicated

Disc one
 "Here with You"
 "Statue of Liberty"
 "Let X=X"
 "Sweaters"
 "My Compensation" (Anderson, Skúli Sverrisson) 
 "Washington Street"
 "Pieces and Parts"
 "Strange Angels"
 "Dark Angel

Disc two
 "Wildebeests"
 "One Beautiful Evening"
 "Poison" (Anderson, Brian Eno)
 "Broken"
 "Progress" (a.k.a. "The Dream Before")
 "Animals"
 "Life on a String"
 "Beginning French"
 "O Superman"
 "Slip Away"
 "White Lily"
 "Puppet Motel" (Anderson, Brian Eno)
 "Love Among the Sailors"
 "Coolsville"

Personnel
Laurie Anderson – vocals, keyboards, violin
Jim Black – drums, electronic percussion
Peter Scherer – keyboards, sampling
Skúli Sverrisson – bass, concertina
Technical
David Bither - executive producer
William Berger – production coordination
Jody Elff - recording, mixing
Adam Blackburn - recording

Notes

Laurie Anderson live albums
2002 live albums
Nonesuch Records live albums
albums recorded at the Town Hall